Lasbela bridge (Urdu:پل لسبيله   ) is located in Lasbela neighborhood of Liaquatabad Town, Karachi, Sindh, Pakistan. The Lasbela bridge is over Lyari River and one of the most important bridges in Karachi.

Jam of Lasbela was ruler of Las Bela State in Balochistan of Pakistan. Jam of Lasbela had one of his official residence or consulate near the Lyari River before independence  of Pakistan. The area got associated with Jam of Lasbela and was known as Lasbela. The newly built bridge in the area over the Lyari River came to be known as Lasbela bridge.

See also 
 Lasbela 
 Liaquatabad Town
 Jinnah Bridge 
 Teen Hatti Bridge
 Napier Mole Bridge
 Sher Shah Bridge

External links
 Teen Hatti Bridge

References

Bridges in Karachi
Bridges in Pakistan